The Communist Party of Finland (SKP) was a communist political party in Finland. The SKP was a section of Comintern and illegal in Finland until 1944.

The SKP was banned by the state from its founding and did not participate in any elections with its own name. Instead, front organisations were used. In the 1920s the communists took part in the Socialist Workers' Party of Finland (1920–1923) and the Socialist Electoral Organisation of Workers and Smallholders (1924–1930). Both of them were also banned. In 1944, a new front, Finnish People's Democratic League was formed. The SKP controlled these fronts but they always had a prominent minority of non-communist socialists.

History

Early stages
In 1918, the Reds lost the Finnish Civil War. The Social Democratic Party of Finland had supported the losing side, and several of its leaders were exiled in Soviet Russia. Some of these exiles founded the Communist Party of Finland in Moscow.

The SKP was illegal in Finland until 1944, and members could be imprisoned. After the Continuation War, the SKP dominated the Finnish People's Democratic League, which was founded in 1944 as an umbrella organization of the radical left.

Cold War

The Cold War era was the high point of Communists in Finland. Between 1944 and 1979 support of the Finnish People's Democratic League was in the range of 17%–24%. Communists participated in several cabinets, but Finland never had a communist Prime Minister or President. In the mid 1960s the U.S. State Department estimated the party membership to be approximately 40 000 (1.44% of the working age population). with the SKP's main rival for domination of the political left being the Social Democratic Party of Finland. The competition was very bitter in trade unions and other leftist organizations.

The SKP received substantial financial support from the Soviet Union during the Cold War. Internally, SKP was divided, with a Eurocommunist mainstream and a hardline pro-Moscow minority, called the Taistoists after their leader, Taisto Sinisalo. The word "taisto" also means "battle" or "fight"; the double connotation made this slur, originally launched by the largest Finnish newspaper Helsingin Sanomat, stick. Soviet threats to withdraw support were the main reason why reformists did not expel the Taistoists from the party leadership or membership.

Aftermaths of the Prague Spring
The events of the Prague Spring followed by the Warsaw Pact invasion of Czechoslovakia had strong repercussions on the SKP. With the SKP's leadership strongly denouncing the Soviet intervention, internal disputes became fiercer than ever. While a de facto Eurocommunist majority held sway, the Taistoist minority decisively stood by the Soviet Union and the Brezhnev doctrine. Gradually this led to a disintegration, and in practice, the party now consisted of two parallel structures, and gradually lost ground in terms of public support. The most hardline leader of the party, Markus Kainulainen, led a group that even opposed Soviet policies after the Perestroika had begun.

In 1985–1986 a large number of Taistoists, hundreds of party organizations with thousands of members, were expelled. They regrouped as the Communist Party of Finland (Unity) (SKPy) which later evolved into the current Communist Party of Finland (1994).

Collapse
The dissolution of the Soviet Union in the early 1990s led to ideological conflicts: bitter internal disputes plagued the party. Bad stock-market investments made during Aalto's term of office resulted in financial bankruptcy in 1992. The SKP never recovered. A majority of the party members, with other member-organizations of SKDL, formed the Left Alliance in 1990.

SKPy, originally the faction of the party expelled in 1985–1986, outlasted its parent and registered itself as the Communist Party of Finland in 1997, but has failed to regain the former Communist Party's parliamentary representation. In the elections of 2007 it won 0.7% of the vote; in April 2011, it won just 0.3%.

Youth wing
The youth wing of the SKP was the Communist Youth League of Finland (SKNL, 1925–1936). After World War II young communists were active in the SKDL's Democratic Youth League of Finland (SNDL). The SNDL was member of World Federation of Democratic Youth.

Leaders

See also

 Kaisu-Mirjami Rydberg
 List of Communist Party (Finland) breakaway parties
 List of Social Democratic Party (Finland) breakaway parties

References

Finland
Finland–Soviet Union relations
Defunct communist parties
Finnish People's Democratic League
Political parties established in 1918
Political parties disestablished in 1992
Defunct political parties in Finland
Communist parties in Finland
Far-left political parties
1918 establishments in Finland
Political parties of the Russian Revolution
1992 disestablishments in Finland
Formerly banned communist parties